Penicillium vancouverense is a species of fungus in the genus Penicillium which was isolated from soil under a maple tree in Vancouver in Canada.

References 

vancouverense
Fungi described in 2011